Allen Township, Kansas may refer to:

 Allen Township, Jewell County, Kansas
 Allen Township, Kingman County, Kansas

See also 
 List of Kansas townships
 Allen Township (disambiguation)

Kansas township disambiguation pages